Trianon–Masp is a station on Line 2 (Green) of the São Paulo Metro. The acronym "MASP" stands for São Paulo Museum of Art, and the name "Trianon" is from the Trianon Park, both south of the station.

Station layout

References

São Paulo Metro stations
Railway stations opened in 1991
Railway stations located underground in Brazil